Best of Dolly Parton, Vol.3 is a 1987 compilation of Dolly Parton's early- to mid-1980s hits that RCA Nashville issued after she left the label. This was the first Dolly Parton CD that featured the song "Potential New Boyfriend" because Burlap & Satin did not have a CD release at the time.

Track listing

References

1987 greatest hits albums
Dolly Parton compilation albums